Darband (before 1991:  or ) is a town in Tajikistan. It is located in Nurobod District, one of the Districts of Republican Subordination. The population of the town is 1,300 (January 2020 estimate).

References

Populated places in Districts of Republican Subordination
Jamoats of Tajikistan